Kuang Sae-Lim is a Thai basketball player. He competed in the men's tournament at the 1956 Summer Olympics.

References

Year of birth missing (living people)
Living people
Kuang Sae-Lim
Kuang Sae-Lim
Basketball players at the 1956 Summer Olympics
Place of birth missing (living people)